The Drama Desk Award for Outstanding Choreography is an annual award presented by Drama Desk in recognition of achievements in the theatre among Broadway, Off Broadway and Off-Off Broadway productions.

Winners and nominees

1960s

1970s

1980s

1990s

2000s

2010s

2020s

Multiple wins

 4 wins
 Kathleen Marshall
 Susan Stroman
 Tommy Tune

 3 wins
 Michael Bennett
 Bob Fosse

 2 wins
 Patricia Birch
 Andy Blankenbuehler
 Warren Carlyle
 Savion Glover
 Twyla Tharp
 Thommie Walsh

See also
 Laurence Olivier Award for Best Theatre Choreographer
 Tony Award for Best Choreography

References

External links
 Drama Desk official website

Choreography